Hazar Nature Reserve is a nature reserve (zapovednik) of Turkmenistan.

It is located on the south-east coast of the Caspian Sea, in Balkan Province and covers an area of 2,690 km2. Ogurjaly Sanctuary is part of this nature reserve.

The climate is continental, the average annual temperature is 15 degrees Celsius.

References

Further reading
National Program for the Protection of the Environment, Ashgabat, 2002, pp. 149-151

External links 
 Web-site

Nature reserves in Turkmenistan
World Heritage Tentative List